Sargocentron cornutum, the threespot squirrelfish, is a member of the family Holocentridae native to the western Pacific Ocean from Indonesia to the Great Barrier Reef. It is a nocturnal predator, feeding on crabs and shrimps by night and hiding under ledges or in caves by day. It can reach sizes of up to  TL and has a venomous preopercle.

References

External links
 
 

cornutum
Fish described in 1854
Fish of the Pacific Ocean